The Elz is a river in Baden-Württemberg, Germany, a right tributary of the Rhine. It rises in the Black Forest, near the source of the Breg. The Elz flows through Elzach, Waldkirch and Emmendingen before reaching the Rhine near Lahr. Its length is approx. .

The lower reaches of the Elz are by-passed by the Leopold Canal, a flood relief canal.

Course 

The Elz rises north of Furtwangen in the area of the Brend and the Rohrhardsberg mountains (between the Furtwänglehof and the Kolmenhof) not far from the source of the Breg which is hydrographically the source of the Danube.

In its upper reaches the Elz flows in a northerly direction, initially through a high valley with pasture land, bog and ice age glacial landforms. Then after a steep drop at the little Elz Falls, it continues through a deeply incised, wooded and sparsely populated V-shaped valley.

In the Oberprechtal valley it bends sharply towards the southwest. This is the start of the middle (actual) Elz valley, which runs in a straight line towards the southwest, separating the  High Black Forest (700 to 900 m) to the southeast from the far lower parts of the Central Black Forest. In the now densely populated valley are the town of Elzach, the villages of Winden and Gutach im Breisgau, where the Elz receives the waters of the Wild Gutach, which is just under half its size. Below the town of Waldkirch the Elz enters the Upper Rhine Plain near Denzlingen in the Freiburg Bay. From now on it flows in a northwesterly direction, past Emmendingen and Teningen. Some of the water of the Elz is diverted into a millstream through Emmendingen, where it drives several hydropower stations and enhances the appearance of the town. Near Riegel on the Kaiserstuhl the Elz merges with the Dreisam from Freiburg im Breisgau and the Old Dreisam.

Soon thereafter the Elz forks again: a certain amount of water (up to 8.5 m3/s) flows down the Old Elz (Alte Elz) through the Europapark Rust to its mouth on the Rhine. Other quantities of water, on average about 13.2 m3/s, is fed along the Leopold Canal, built by Johann Gottfried Tulla, northwest of Rheinhausen into the Rhine. The Old Elz empties higher up, near Schwanau, into the Rhine. Today it is led down various Old Rhine channels parallel to the Rhine to the southern edge of Kehl, a distance of 121 kilometres from the source; formerly it was over 90 kilometres long.

Tributaries 
The table shows all tributaries that are longer than 5 kilometres, with the exception of millstreams alongside rivers. Based on the waterbody number (Fließgewässerkennziffer), the Frischnaubach is the highest tributary  - it discharges into the Elz in the parish of Prechtal. The Ettenbach is the lowest tributary and empties into the Elz just before Grafenhausen. All tributaries have their catchment areas  in the county of Emmendingen, with the exception of the Ettenbach, which flows through in Ortenaukreis.

Fauna 
Commonly found species of fish in the Elz are the:
 Barbel
 Chub
 Dace
 Riffle minnow
 Common minnow
 River trout
 Grayling
 Eel
 Pike
 Roach
 Rudd

Gallery

References

External links 

 Course of the Elz at: 
 Interessengemeinschaft-Elz e. V. – numerous photographs, including some historical photographs.
 EG Wasserrahmenrichtlinie Bericht zur Bestandsaufnahme Teilbearbeitungsgebiet 31 Elz-Dreisam (pdf file; 1.15 MB)
 ELZ: Fluss oder Kanal?

Rivers of Baden-Württemberg
Rivers of the Black Forest
 
Rivers of Germany